Robert Vattier (2 October 1906 – 9 December 1982) was a French actor.

He was the father of the comedic actress Bérangère Vattier.

Selected filmography

 Marius (1931) - Albert Brun
 Fanny (1932) - Albert Brun
 Vers l'abîme (1934) - Barrick
 Minuit... place Pigalle (1934)
 Jeanne (1934) - Charles Fuqui
 Gaspard de Besse (1935) - La Griffe
 The Terrible Lovers (1936) - L'avocat de Annette
 César (1936) - Aldebert Brun
 Adventure in Paris (1936) - Maître Corneille - l'huissier
 Le coeur dispose (1937) - Pretendant
 L'appel de la vie (1937) - Pièche
 La chanson du souvenir (1937) - Florian
 The Messenger (1937) - Le représentant (uncredited)
 Heartbeat (1938) - Astruc
 The Baker's Wife (1938) - Le curé
 Three Waltzes (1938) - Le metteur en scène
 Le moulin dans le soleil (1938)
 Le club des fadas (1939)
 Monsieur Brotonneau (1939) - William Herrer
 The Last of the Six (1941) - L'administrateur (uncredited)
 Madame Sans-Gêne (1941) - Jasmin
 Le Lit à colonnes (1942) - Un inspecteur (uncredited)
 Andorra ou les hommes d'Airain (1942) - Le Bayle
 Lettres d'amour (1942) - Maître Boubousson
 La Main du diable (1943) - Perrier (uncredited)
 Un seul amour (1943) - Gontran de La Tournelle
 Bonsoir mesdames, bonsoir messieurs (1944) - Coulant
 The Ideal Couple (1946) - Le commissaire
 L'aventure de Cabassou (1946) - De Salicette
 Si jeunesse savait... (1948) - Lucien Bigne
 Between Eleven and Midnight (1949) - Charlie
 The King (1949) - Marquis de Chamarande
 La Marie du port (1950) - Le client de la brasserie mécontent
 La Ronde (1950) - Le professeur Schüller (uncredited)
 No Pity for Women (1950) - Adolphe Mercier - un homme d'affaires
 The Girl from Maxim's (1950) - Le docteur Montgicourt
 Atoll K (1951) - Le notaire français
 The Strange Madame X (1951) - Moissac
 La vie est un jeu (1951)
 La plus belle fille du monde (1951) - Le procureur Paul Thomas
 Massacre in Lace (1952) - Arsène de Loubiac
 Le crime du Bouif (1952) - Le juge d'instruction
 Women Are Angels (1952)  - Le docteur
 Bille de clown (1952)
 Manon des sources (1952) - Monsieur Belloiseau
 Au diable la vertu (1953) - Le juge d'instruction
 Children of Love (1953) - Albert
 Obsession (1954) - Le directeur de l'hôtel (uncredited)
 Letters from My Windmill (1954) - Le père Abbé (segment "Elixir du père Gaucher, L'")
 Trois de la Canebière (1955) - Bienaimé
 Ces sacrées vacances (1956) - L'inspecteur Ferracci
 Magirama (1956)
 Miss Catastrophe (1957) - Le colonel
 Irresistible Catherine (1957) - Me Revering
 Vacances explosives! (1957) - Fernand Morel
 On Foot, on Horse, and on Wheels (1957) - L'inspecteur du permis de conduire
 Love Is at Stake (1957) - (uncredited)
 Isabelle Is Afraid of Men (1957) - M. Brissac
 Fumée blonde (1957) - Le commissaire
 Les Truands (1957) - Le duc de Morny
 It's All Adam's Fault (1958) - Noël
 Neither Seen Nor Recognized (1958) - Lerechigneux, le juge
 School for Coquettes (1958) - Racinet
 Madame et son auto (1958) - M. Margaillat
 La p... sentimentale (1958) - Vachette - le surveillant général
 Péché de jeunesse (1958) - Monsieur Chale, un pensionnaire
 Dangerous Games (1958) - De Fontbelle, le professeur de violon
 Houla Houla (1959) - Le directeur d'école
 Soupe au lait (1959) - Le directeur
 The Love Game (1960) - L'acheteur galant
 Le mouton (1960) - Le directeur de la prison
 The President (1961) - Docteur Fumet
 Spotlight on a Murderer (1961) - Le notaire
 La traversée de la Loire (1962)
 Le petit monstre (1965)
 Asterix the Gaul (1967) - (voice)
 L'oeuf (1972) - Monsieur Raffard
 Far from Dallas (1972) - Inspector
 Nuova Colonia (1978) - Tobba

External links

1906 births
1982 deaths
French male film actors
Actors from Rennes
20th-century French male actors